Brachyurophis incinctus is a species of snake from the family Elapidae, commonly named the unbanded shovel-nosed snake, and is a species endemic to Australia. Its common name reflects its shovel nose specialisation, burrowing behaviour and the fact that it is not banded on its body.

Description 
The unbanded shovel-nosed snake is an oviparous, venomous,  and small (< 400mm) burrowing snake, which is not banded on its body.

Taxonomy 
Brachyurophis incinctus is one of eight currently recognised species within the genus Brachyurophis. It was first described by Glen Milton Storr in 1968 as Vermicella semifasciata subsp. incincta.

Distribution & habitat 
Brachyurophis incinctus is found in central Australia (in the Northern Territory) and in western Queensland, in grasslands, shrublands and deserts.

Conservation status 
The conservation status of B. incinctus is assessed by the Queensland Government as being of "Least Concern" and is similarly assessed by  the IUCN, with the  comment that it is  "unlikely that any major threat is impacting this species".

References

External links 
 Brachyurophis incinctus occurrence data from Atlas of Living Australia
Brachyurophis incinctus: images from Inaturalist

Snakes of Australia
incinctus
Taxa named by Glen Milton Storr